The 1948–49 season was Aberdeen's 37th season in the top flight of Scottish football and their 38th season competed in the Scottish League First Division, Scottish League Cup, and the Scottish Cup.

Results

Division A

Final League table

Scottish League Cup

Group Section D

Section D Final Table

Scottish Cup

References

AFC Heritage Trust

Aberdeen F.C. seasons
Aber